Metopoplectus similaris is a species of beetle in the family Cerambycidae. It was first described by Gressitt in 1945.

References

Agapanthiini
Beetles described in 1945